Manika is a commune of the city of Kolwezi in the Democratic Republic of the Congo.

Populated places in Lualaba Province
Democratic Republic of Congo geography articles needing translation from French Wikipedia
Communes of the Democratic Republic of the Congo